Burnett & Reid LLP is a full service law firm in Aberdeen, Scotland. It claims to be the oldest legal practice in the city and one of the longest established legal practices in the United Kingdom.

Services 
It is ranked in the UK Legal 500 for Private Client, and by Chambers & Partners for their expertise in Agricultural Law. The firm are also members of the ASPC. According to the firm's website, their full practice includes the areas of:

 Agricultural Law
 Commercial Property
 Corporate Law
 Litigation
 Oil & Gas Law
 Private Client
 Renewables
 Residential Property
 Trust Law

History 

Burnett & Reid was first established by William Burnett on 11 July 1754, when Burnett was fully admitted to membership of Society of Advocates. William was eventually succeeded in the business by his sixth son, Thomas Burnett, who joined the business in 1796, and who in turn was joined in the business in 1823 by his son, Newell Burnett.

Following the death of his father, Newell Burnett assumed John Reid as a partner at which point the firm first began trading under the name of "Burnett & Reid". In 2012, the firm converted to an LLP, adopting the name Burnett & Reid LLP.

References

Law firms of Scotland
Companies based in Aberdeen
1754 establishments in Scotland
British companies established in 1754
Law firms established in 1754